The following is a list of awards and nominations received by Keyshia Cole, an American singer from California.

Awards and nominations

References

External links 

 
 

Lists of awards received by American musician
Awards